Columbia is a neighborhood located in Downtown San Diego, California. The neighborhood is largely commercial, however there are many highrise condominium buildings under construction.

The Midway Aircraft Carrier Museum and the Maritime Museum are located in this neighborhood.

Geography
Columbia is located south of Little Italy, north of the Marina District, and west of Core and the Horton District. This district is bordered by Ash Street to the north, F Street to the south, Union Street to the east and the Pacific Ocean to the west.

The Santa Fe Depot is served by the Trolley, the Coaster and the Pacific Surfliner.

Redevelopment
Parts of Columbia are under re-development, including the North Embarcadero Visionary Plan, Navy Broadway Complex and the Embarcadero Circle cruise ship terminal expansion. As of March 16, 2007, there are seven high-rise buildings scheduled for or currently under construction: five of these buildings are condominiums, one is office, and one is a Federal court house; six buildings have more than 20 floors, four buildings have more than 30 floors, and one building has more than 40 floors.

References

External links
Downtown Neighborhoods Map
SanDiego.org: Columbia
Information on Columbia Neighborhood
Downtown San Diego Columbia Real Estate

Neighborhoods in San Diego
Urban communities in San Diego
San Diego Bay